Momoh Gulama was a Sierra Leonean paramount chief who ruled Kaiyamba Chiefdom in Moyamba District.

Early life
Gulama was born in Moyamba, Moyamba District in the Southern Province of Sierra Leone. His was the second son of Kaiyamba, a Mende warrior who came to Moyamba from Kono sometime in the 1820s and his wife was Guwanalo.

His brothers were also chiefs and founded the royal houses Boyawa and M’Bomeh.

Family
He is the father of Paramount Chief Julius Gulama and the grandfather of Paramount Chief Madam Ella Koblo Gulama.

Further reading
 Julius Gulama
 Lucy Gulama
 Ella Koblo Gulama
 Komeh Gulama Lansana
 David Lansana

External links
The life and Times of Honourable PC Madam Ella Koblo Gulama of Sierra Leone By Awareness Times, September 26, 2006
Tribute to the Honourable PC Ella Koblo Gulama, Sierra Connection
Women Leaders In Africa

References

Sierra Leonean politicians
Sierra Leonean nobility
People from Moyamba District
1956 deaths
Year of birth missing